Gerd Michael Henneberg (14 July 1922 – 1 January 2011) was a German actor and theater director.

Biography
Gerd Henneberg's father, Richard, was a theater director. After the young Heeneberg took private acting classes, he debuted on stage at age sixteen, in the Leipzig Theater. Afterwards, he worked in the Aschaffenburg Theater and later became a member of the cast in the German National Theater in Weimar, where he remained until after the end of World War II.

In 1948, Henneberg moved to East Berlin. He appeared on the stages of the Schiffbauerdamm Theater and the People's Theater, but finally settled in the Maxim Gorky Theater. Henneberg's most recognized performance was that of Scanlon of One Flew Over the Cuckoo's Nest, a character he depicted more than four hundred times. On 5 October 1960, he was awarded the People's Artist Prize. In  1960, he was named manager of the Neustrelitz Theater. In February 1962 he assumed the same duties in the Dresden Theater.

Henneberg was removed from the latter post in October 1965, after the Socialist Unity Party of Germany disapproved of several plays he allowed to be performed and from the lack of cooperation with communist writers. He was criticized for lacking "Socialist ardor", and had to announce that he left due to "failing to make a contribution to Socialist dramaturgy." Henneberg returned to Neustrelitz, where he remained as manager until 1968. He continued to direct plays and to perform in the Maxim Gorky Theater until the 1980s, and made his last appearance on stage in Dresden, in 1997.

Beside his theatrical work, he also appeared in some sixty cinema and television productions, mostly East German ones. He is mostly remembered for portraying Wilhelm Keitel in all of Yuri Ozerov's World War II films and for making several guest appearances in the popular crime drama Polizeiruf 110.

After a prolonged illness, Henneberg died on New Year's Day 2011.

Partial filmography

 Hexen (1954) - Staudten-Enderlein
 Heimliche Ehen (1956) - Fischer
 Thomas Müntzer (1956) - Evangelischer Pfarrer
 Das tapfere Schneiderlein (1956) - Schatzmeister Gier
 Die Millionen der Yvette (1956) - Offizier
 The Crucible (1957) - Herrick
 Lissy (1957) - Staudinger
 Berlin – Ecke Schönhauser… (1957) - Amerikaner
 Spielbank-Affäre (1957) - Reporter
 Der Fackelträger (1957) - Schulze IV
 Die Schönste (1957)
 Tilman Riemenschneider (1958) - Fürstbischoff Konrad von Thüringen
 Im Sonderauftrag (1959) - Hafenkommandant
 Ware für Katalonien (1959) - Geschäftsführer
 Thirty Cases of Major Zeman (1961) - 1. Herr in der S-Bahn
 Nebel (1963) - Prosecutor
 Frozen Flashes (1967) - Speer
 Ways across the Country (1968, TV Mini-Series) - Erster Offizier in Krakau
 Das siebente Jahr (1969) - Oberarzt
 Verdacht auf einen Toten (1969) - Hendrik Jahn
 Liberation I: The Fire Bulge (1970) - Generalfeldmarschall Wilhelm Keitel
 Liberation II: Breakthrough (1970) - Generalfeldmarschall Wilhelm Keitel
 Liberation III: Direction of the Main Blow (1971) - Generalfeldmarschall Wilhelm Keitel
 Liberation IV: The Battle of Berlin (1971) - Generalfeldmarschall Wilhelm Keitel
 Trotz alledem! (1972)
 Leichensache Zernik (1972) - (uncredited)
 Chyornye sukhari (1972)
 Nakovalnya ili chuk (1972) - Reichsminister Konstantin von Neurath
 Polizeiruf 110 (1972–1990, TV Series) - Alfred Ditsch / Dr. Bokelch / Arzt
 Goroda i gody (1974) - Gubernator
 Istoki (1974) - Posol
 Den, ktory neumrie (1974) - generál Höffle
 Soldiers of Freedom (1977, TV Mini-Series) - Generalfeldmarschall Wilhelm Keitel (1977)
 Fleur Lafontaine (1978) - Oberstabsarzt von Wirsing
 Für Mord kein Beweis (1979) - Dr. Helmissen
 Bürgschaft für ein Jahr (1981)
 Little Alexander (1981) - Loberg
 Dein unbekannter Bruder (1982) - Kommissar Bolten
  (1985)
 Battle of Moscow (1985) - Generalfeldmarschall Wilhelm Keitel
  (1987) - Zweiter Angestellter des Instituts
 Ich liebe dich - April! April! (1988) - Prof. Stein
  (1989) - Alter Mann
 Stalingrad (1989) - Generalfeldmarschall Wilhelm Keitel
 Angely smerti (1993) - Generalfeldmarschall Wilhelm Keitel (final film role)

References

External links

Gerd Michael Henneberg on the Maxim Gorky Theater's website.
Gerd Michael Henneberg on polizeiruf-110.eu.
Gerd Michael Henneberg on filmportal.de.
Gerd Michael Henneberg on kino-teatr.ru.

1922 births
2011 deaths
Actors from Magdeburg
People from the Province of Saxony
German male stage actors
German theatre directors
German theatre managers and producers
German male film actors
German male television actors
Recipients of the Patriotic Order of Merit in bronze